Francesco Morone (born June 6, 1956, Lanciano, Abruzzo, Italy) known as Franco Morone, is an Italian guitar player, teacher, composer and arranger specializing in the fingerstyle technique. He is the author of several books and has recorded CDs and videos playing his original music, which combines traditional Italian and Celtic melodies with jazz, blues and folk influences. He currently performs and teaches across Europe, the United States, and Japan.

Biography
Francesco started playing guitar at age 12 and published his first guitar book, My Acoustic Blues Guitar, in 1986. He obtained a degree in Law from the 
University of Bologna in 1987 and has worked as a journalist with the magazines Guitar Club, Chitarre and Acoustic Guitar.

As a musician, Morone has performed with Alex de Grassi, Beppe Gambetta, Peter Finger, Tim Sparks, and Leo Kottke. He regularly performs solo and in a duo with singer Raffaella Luna and has recorded for Ariola MBG, Carisch, Bèrben and currently produces with his label Acoustic Guitar Workshops.

His collection Italian Fingerstyle Guitar has achieved recognition in the category of best album of the solo guitar by GPJ Folk Awards for American independent music.

Discography
Stranalandia – BMG 1990
Guitàrea - AMR 1994
The South Wind – AMR 1996
Melodies Of Memories - AMR 1998
Running Home - AMR 2001
Italian Fingerstyle Guitar - Traditional and Popular Songs - AMR 2003
The Road To Lisdoonvarna - AMR 2005
Songs We Love –con Raffaella Luna – AGR 2008
Miles Of Blues – AGR 2010
Back to My Best – AGR 2012
Canti Lontani Nel Tempo – Italian Traditional Songs – con Raffaella Luna -AGR 2013

Bibliography
My Acoustic Blues Guitar/Metodo per Chitara Blues– AMR  - Bèrben 1986
Stranalandia – 1990 AMR
Fingerstyle Jazz – AMBooks – Bèrben 1992
Guitàrea – AGBooks – Bèrben 1994
The South Wind/Celtic Collection – AMR Carisch 1996
Melodies Of Memories – AMR 1998
Italian Fingerstyle Guitar - Carisch 2003
Master Anthology of Blues Guitar Solos, Volume One – Mel Bay 2000
Master Anthology of Fingerstyle Guitar Solos, Volume 1 - Mel Bay 2000
Basic Fingerstyle Collection– AMR /Carisch 2007
10 Duets for Fingerstyle Guitar -  con Ulli Boegershausen - AMBooks 2009
Blues & Jazz for Fingerstyle Guitar Mel Bay 2011
Back To My Best – Carisch 2012

Videos
Fingerstyle Blues – Playgame 1993
In Concert – con Tim Sparks AMR 2005
Acoustic Guitar Solos - Mel Bay 2008
Acoustic Guitar Masters, Vol. 1 AMR 2009

Discografia
Guitaròma – Lizard 1985
Collana Strumento – BMG
Guitar Highlights – AMR 1994
Guitar Ballads – AMR 1998

References

External links
 Franco Morone's official website
 Freight and Salvage live concert, (2012)
Interview with Accordo.it (Italian)

Italian guitarists
Italian male guitarists
Living people
1956 births